Heiress often refers to a female heir, the beneficiary of an inheritance.

Heiress may also refer to:

Music
 Heiress (band), an American rock band
 Heiress Records, a record company

Theatre, film, and television
 Heiress, a 1988 Chinese TV series aired by SBC Channel 8
 "Chapter 11: The Heiress", a 2020 episode of The Mandalorian
 The Heiress, a 1949 film based on the play by Ruth and Augustus Goetz 
 "The Heiress", episode of the 1959 TV series Interpol Calling
 The Heiress (1786 play), a 1786 play by John Burgoyne
 The Heiress (1947 play), a 1947 play by Ruth and Augustus Goetz 
 The Heiresses (1980 film), a 1980 Hungarian drama film 
 The Heiresses (2018 film), a 2018 Paraguayan drama film

Other
 Heiress (fragrance), a line of perfumes
 The Heiress, a novel by Ellen Pickering

See also
 Heir (disambiguation)
 Inheritor (disambiguation)